Grantville is an unincorporated community in East Hanover Township, Dauphin County, Pennsylvania, United States. It is part of the Harrisburg–Carlisle Metropolitan Statistical Area.

Points of Interest
 Hollywood Casino at Penn National Race Course
 Monocoupe Aeroplane and Engine Corporation
 Monocoupe Aircraft
  St. John's United Methodist Church, Grantville

Controversy
During the 2016 Halloween Parade, a float depicting Hillary Clinton behind bars alongside campaign signs for local representative Sue Helm, who was up for reelection. People in attendance shouted "Lock her up!" as the float passed by. The incident caused some townspeople to write to the township in opposition of its approval to let the float into the parade, as the event was not meant to be partisan.

See also
Manada Hill, Pennsylvania
Shellsville, Pennsylvania

References

External links

 
Unincorporated communities in Dauphin County, Pennsylvania
Harrisburg–Carlisle metropolitan statistical area
 01
Unincorporated communities in Pennsylvania